André Fontaine (Paris, France; 30 March 1921 – ibidem, 17 March 2013) was a French historian and journalist. He started working at Temps Présent, and then was director at Le Monde in 1947, at the official beginning of the Cold War. He became the newspaper's editor from 1969 to 1985, and director from 1985 to 1991. As of February 2007 he was still contributing articles to the paper. André Fontaine is famous for his historical thesis, according to which the Cold War in fact started as soon as 1917 with the cordon sanitaire policy.

Fontaine died in Paris on 17 March 2013, aged 91.

Bibliography

 L'Alliance atlantique à l'heure du dégel, Calmann-Lévy, 1960
 Histoire de la Guerre froide in two volumes (De la révolution d'octobre à la guerre de Corée and De la guerre de Corée à la crise des alliances), 1965 et 1966, Fayard
 La Guerre civile froide, 1969, Fayard
 Le Dernier Quart du siècle, 1976, Fayard
 La France au bois dormant, 1978, Fayard
 Histoire de la détente (Un seul lit pour deux rêves), 1981, Fayard
 Sortir de l'hexagonie, Stock 1984
 L'un sans l'autre, 1991, Fayard
 Après eux le déluge, de Kaboul à Sarajevo, 1995, La Martinière
 La Tache rouge, le roman de la Guerre froide, 2004, La Martinière ; re-edited with augmented chronology, Le Seuil, « Points »-histoire, 2006

References

French journalists
20th-century French historians
Cold War historians
1921 births
2013 deaths
French male non-fiction writers